Shopper may refer to:
Shopping trolley (caddy)
The Shopper, an Australian passenger train
Plastic shopping bag in Pakistani English

People
Personal shopper, a person who helps others shop by giving advice and making suggestions

Media
"Window Shopper", a 2005 single by rapper 50 Cent
A pennysaver, newspaper that contains only or mainly advertising
Auto Shopper, established by Showcase Publications, Inc. of Toms River, New Jersey in 1978
Mysterious Personal Shopper, a 2018 South Korean television series 
News Shopper, titles are local newspapers published in South East London and North West Kent by Newsquest
Personal Shopper, a 2016 supernatural psychological thriller film written and directed by Olivier Assayas
Spirituality Shopper, a short-lived British television series that ran on Channel 4 for 3 episodes in 2005
TV Shopper, an early American daytime television series which aired on the DuMont Television Network 
Webcam Social Shopper, often referred to as virtual dressing room software

Organizations

Euro Shopper, a discount brand of everyday commodities developed and marketed by AMS Sourcing B.V.
Happy Shopper, an English brand of independent convenience products

See also 

Computer Shopper (disambiguation)
Secret shopper (disambiguation)